Seashore is a 2015 Brazilian drama film, directed by Filipe Matzembacher and Marcio Reolon, starring Mateus Almada, Maurício Barcellos, Irene Brietzke, Elisa Brittes, Maitê Felistoffa, Francisco Gick, Fernando Hart, and Danuta Zaguetto.

Plot
On a trip to the coast of Southern Brazil, the friends Martin and Tomaz are united in the task that Martin has; seek documents requested by the father, which are with relatives who reside on the coast. Enclosed during the weekend in a small town in the winter, the two young men seek to reconnect their old friendship and end up making new discoveries.

Cast 

 Mateus Almada as Martin
 Maurício Barcellos as Tomaz Irene Brietzke as Marisa Elisa Brittes as Natalia Maitê Felistoffa as Carol Francisco Gick as Maurício Fernando Hart	as Bento Danuta Zaguetto as Luíza Luisa Moser as Rosa Ariel Artur as Security Guard''

Awards and nominations

References

External links
 

2010s Portuguese-language films
Brazilian comedy-drama films
2015 comedy-drama films
Films set in Brazil
Brazilian LGBT-related films
2015 LGBT-related films
LGBT-related comedy-drama films
Gay-related films
2015 comedy films